Michelle Shocked (born Karen Michelle Johnston; February 24, 1962) is an American singer-songwriter. Her music has entered the Billboard Hot 100, been nominated for the Grammy Award for Best Contemporary Folk Album, and received an award for Folk Album of the Year at the CMJ New Music Awards.

Early life
Shocked was born Karen Michelle Johnston on February 24, 1962, in Dallas, Texas, at the Baylor University Medical Center. Her stepfather was in the US Army and the family moved from base to base, eventually settling in Gilmer, Texas. She was raised in a Mormon family. Johnston went through a punk rock phase, wearing a Mohawk hairdo and squatting in abandoned buildings in San Francisco, California.

Career
In 1984, Johnston adopted the stage name "Michelle Shocked", a play on the expression "shell shocked", she said in a 1992 interview with Green Left Weekly: "The term 'Miss shell shocked' is a direct reference to the thousand-yard stare, which was a term that they first used to describe the victims of shell-shock in World War I. These people from outward appearances had survived the war quite well when in fact inside their minds were blown. I first used that name in 1984 at the Democratic Convention in San Francisco where I was arrested for protesting and demonstrating against corporations who contribute money to both the Democratic Party and the Republican Party campaigns."

Shocked received her first international exposure after Pete Lawrence recorded her performance on a portable tape recorder at the Kerrville Folk Festival in Texas. Lawrence released the tape in Europe as The Texas Campfire Tapes (1986) (later released as The Texas Campfire Takes). The album's success brought major labels asking her to sign a contract. Shocked was resistant to what she saw as the machinations of the music industry, and worked to retain a degree of creative control.

Mercury trilogy 
Her first US success came with the release of her 1988 debut album, Short Sharp Shocked, on college radio rotations around the country, which was met with strong acclaim from listeners. The debut single, "Anchorage", charted on the Billboard Hot 100, but a follow-up single from the album, "When I Grow Up", did not chart.  Short Sharp Shocked was the first album in what Shocked later described as a "trilogy" for Mercury Records.

The second album in the trilogy, Captain Swing, was released in 1989. Described by reviewer Chris Woodstra as an album of "swing and big-band music" that "no one expected," the album was promoted with the release of "On the Greener Side", a gender-reversed parody of Robert Palmer's 1986 single "Addicted to Love", in which topless male models performed the motions made famous by the female models in Palmer's video.

The trilogy concluded with her 1992 album, Arkansas Traveler. Her desire to have the cover portray her in blackface in tribute to the roots of the music featured on the album drew criticism and a change in the cover art. However, the album received little commercial notice, and Shocked parted ways with the label following an acrimonious lawsuit.

Post-Mercury years 
In 1995, Shocked contributed an original song to the soundtrack for the film Dead Man Walking called "Quality of Mercy." In 1996, she released a studio version of Kind Hearted Woman on the short-lived Private Music label.

Starting in 2002 with the release of Deep Natural, Shocked established her own label, Mighty Sound. She reissued expanded versions of her entire catalog, made possible by having retained complete ownership of her work when she signed with Mercury in 1987.

An acoustic version of her song "How You Play the Game" was featured as the opening and credits soundtrack on the DVD of the 2004 documentary film Bush's Brain.

Shocked continues to make music as an independent artist. In June 2005, she released a trilogy of albums called Threesome (Don't Ask Don't Tell, Mexican Standoff and Got No Strings). In May 2007, she released the album ToHeavenURide; and in September 2009, Soul of My Soul.

Soul of My Soul remains Shocked's last released recording to date.  She toured consistently through 2013, then took time off before resuming live performances and touring in 2016.

She is a vocal critic of Spotify and its low pay rates for artists, declaring that "None of my music will be on there until they commit to a sustainable rate rather than suing songwriters."

Personal life
Shocked's younger brother is the musician and multi-instrumentalist Max Johnston, of Uncle Tupelo, Wilco and The Gourds.

In 1992, Shocked married journalist Bart Bull. They divorced in 2004. She reported in 2007 that she was in a relationship with Disney artist David Willardson, with whom she had first worked in 2001 when he designed the branding for her record label Mighty Sound. Willardson has since designed album covers for Deep Natural and for Shocked's album reissues. Willardson and Shocked share an artist's studio in the Biscuit Company Lofts.

Sexuality

According to Gay 100 author Paul Russell, in 1989 she joked to a US broadcast television audience that the Grammy award for Best Contemporary Folk Recording, whose nominees included herself, eventual winner Tracy Chapman, Phranc, and Indigo Girls, should have been called "Best Lesbian Vocalist". Shocked herself remembers that she joked the award "could have been called 'They Might Be Lesbians'".

After an Earth Day performance in Chicago in April 1990, she gave an interview to Christie L. Nordhielm of Outlines, a Chicago newspaper for the gay community. Accompanied by future husband, journalist Bart Bull, she told Nordhielm she felt boxed in by listener expectations that she was either straight or gay; she said "I would like a much broader definition for myself." She explained her wish to be politically and sexually subversive by saying, "I resent like hell that I was maybe 18 years old before I even heard the 'L' word. I mean, that's understood, growing up sheltered in a Mormon environment. But it would have made all the difference for me had I grown up knowing that the reason I didn't fit in, was because they hadn't told me there were more categories to fit into." She said she did not condone the outing activities engaged in by members of ACT UP.

Since then, Shocked has been listed as bisexual in reference books, and does not self-identify as a lesbian. In a 2013 interview with CNN, Shocked stated "I am, for the last 10 years, so deeply in love with a man that the idea of living my life without him is impossible. I know how much I love him, and knowing that passion that I have for him, would I ever want to deny that to anyone else? Absolutely not."

Religion and views on homosexuality
While performing at the Wild Goose Festival in June 2011, a Christian event at which the inclusion of gay Christians was debated, Shocked responded to an audience member's question about homosexuality by saying "Who drafted me as a gay icon? You are looking at the world's greatest homophobe. Ask God what He thinks."

On March 17, 2013, Shocked made an impromptu speech against same-sex marriage during a concert at Yoshi's nightclub in San Francisco, which led some audience members to leave in protest and the club's management to end the show. All venues eventually cancelled scheduled performances of her "Roadworks Tour" in response to reports of Shocked's remarks. In a March 20, 2013, email to the news media, Shocked apologized, saying that her comments had been misinterpreted, and that she was not describing her own opinions about homosexuality, but rather those of some Christians. An audio recording of the performance was reported as contradicting Shocked's post-performance explanation.

On April 1, 2013, Shocked appeared on CNN's Piers Morgan Live to clarify her remarks. Morgan asked Shocked three times whether she was "homophobic". Eventually, Shocked stated "If you want to keep this simple for the audience, let me just give you a straight no, I'm not homophobic. But the truth, I don't think, lies in the simplicity. It's in the nuance, and that's been completely lost in this." She said that the meaning behind her prior comments was misinterpreted.

Political activity

A photograph of Shocked being detained during a protest that appears on the cover of her 1988 album Short Sharp Shocked was taken by Chris Hardy of the San Francisco Examiner at a protest in San Francisco during the 1984 Democratic National Convention. Years later, Shocked was arrested during the November 29, 2011, eviction of the Occupy Los Angeles movement.

Awards
Shocked was honored as having the Folk Album of the Year at the CMJ New Music Awards ceremony in late October 1989, taped in New York City for later broadcast. The award recognized the popularity of Short Sharp Shocked with college radio listeners.

Discography

Albums

Re-releases
Michelle Shocked has re-released her Mercury releases in expanded form on her own Mighty Sound imprint
 Texas Campfire Takes (April 22, 2003) – two-disc expanded reissue of The Texas Campfire Tapes
 Short Sharp Shocked (September 23, 2003) – two-disc set
 Captain Swing (March 16, 2004)
 Arkansas Traveler (September 14, 2004)

Compilations
 Mercury Poise: 1988–1995 (Mercury, 1996) 
 Shockolates (Mighty Sound, 2004) 
 Threesome (Mighty Sound, 2005) – compiles Don't Ask Don't Tell, Mexican Standoff, and Got No Strings

Other releases
 Live (Mercury, 1990) – promo only 12" EP with five tracks recorded live at the Oxford Apollo, London on 12 December 1989
 Captain Swing Review (Polygram, 1990) – live concert film, VHS
 Michelle Shocked DVD (Mighty Sound, 2004) – compilation

"Mood Swing" and "Mighty Sound" are the label names Shocked uses/has used for her independent self-owned releases.

Singles

References

External links
 
 

American folk singers
American women singer-songwriters
Crossover (music)
Musicians from Dallas
Fast Folk artists
Former Latter Day Saints
University of Texas at Austin alumni
1962 births
Living people
Anti-folk musicians
Mercury Records artists
American Pentecostals
Members of the Church of God in Christ
Singer-songwriters from Texas
Private Music artists
Guitarists from Texas
20th-century American women guitarists
20th-century American guitarists
21st-century American women guitarists
21st-century American guitarists
20th-century American women singers
People from Gilmer, Texas
21st-century American women singers
20th-century American singers
21st-century American singers
Women punk rock singers
American LGBT singers